German submarine U-601 was a Type VIIC U-boat built for Nazi Germany's Kriegsmarine for service in World War II. She was commissioned on 18 December 1941 and sunk on 25 February 1944, having sunk four ships. Her commanders were Peter-Ottmar Grau and Otto Hansen.

Description
U-601 was built by Blohm & Voss, Hamburg as yard number 577. She was ordered on 22 May 1940 and the keel was laid down on 10 February 1941. U-601 was launched on 29 October 1941.

Design
German Type VIIC submarines were preceded by the shorter Type VIIB submarines. U-601 had a displacement of  when at the surface and  while submerged. She had two shafts and two  propellers.

U-601 was fitted with five  torpedo tubes (four fitted at the bow and one at the stern), fourteen torpedoes, one  SK C/35 naval gun, 220 rounds and a  C/30 anti-aircraft gun. The boat had a complement of between forty-four and sixty.

Service history
She took part in ten patrols; exclusively in the Arctic Ocean. She was assigned to:
 5th U-boat Flotilla (18 December 1941 – 30 June 1942)
 11th U-boat Flotilla (1 July 1942 – 31 May 1943)
 13th U-boat Flotilla (1 June 1943 – 25 February 1944)

Fate
She was sunk by depth charges in the Arctic Ocean on 25 February 1944 North west of Narvik, Norway by a RAF Catalina at position . She was lost with all 51 hands.

Wolfpacks
U-601 took part in five wolfpacks, namely:
 Boreas (19 November – 6 December 1942)
 Wiking (20 September – 3 October 1943)
 Eisenbart (19 December 1943 – 5 January 1944)
 Isegrim (16 – 27 January 1944)
 Werwolf (27 January – 1 February 1944)

Summary of raiding history

References

Bibliography

Further reading

External links
 

Ships built in Hamburg
German Type VIIC submarines
U-boats commissioned in 1941
U-boats sunk in 1944
World War II submarines of Germany
World War II shipwrecks in the Arctic Ocean
1941 ships
U-boats sunk by depth charges
U-boats sunk by British aircraft
Ships lost with all hands
Maritime incidents in February 1944